The Iowa State–Kansas State football rivalry is an American college football rivalry between the Iowa State Cyclones and the Kansas State Wildcats every year since 1917, making it the among the longest continuous series in college football history as of 2020, as well as the single-longest never-interrupted rivalry in college football. Because so many college football rivalries were interrupted by the 2020 Covid pandemic, Iowa State-Kansas State and California-UCLA are now the only  two never-interrupted rivalries that still exist in the Football Bowl Subdivision of NCAA Division I college football. The October 2016 game marked the 100th straight year the two teams have met.

History
The teams first met in 1917, when both universities were members of the erstwhile Missouri Valley Conference. The match-up continued as an annual conference game through the schools' shift into the Big 12 Conference. The series has been dominated by long winning streaks for both teams, with each team's longest winning streak at 10 games. While Kansas State has gone 25–7 against the Cyclones since 1989, Iowa State leads the series 52–50–4.

Historically, the game was not considered a major rivalry, but in light of changes in the Big 12 in the late 2000s, the universities pushed to highlight it to generate revenue and interest for their football programs. They scheduled two neutral-site games at Arrowhead Stadium in Kansas City, Missouri in 2009 and 2010, which fans and the media dubbed "Farmageddon", a reference to the agricultural roots of these land-grant universities.

Game results

See also 
 List of NCAA college football rivalry games
 List of most-played college football series in NCAA Division I

References

College football rivalries in the United States
Iowa State Cyclones football
Kansas State Wildcats football
Recurring sporting events established in 1917